Michael O'Donnell may refer to:

 Michael O'Donnell (physician) (1928–2019), British doctor, journalist, author, and broadcaster
 Michael O'Donnell (Kansas politician) (born 1985), American researcher, and lecturer
 Michael E. O'Donnell, American biochemist
 Michael O'Donnell (rugby league), New Zealand former professional rugby league footballer
 Michael A. O'Donnell, American writer and researcher 
 Michael O'Donnell (Missouri politician), politician in Missouri